In combinatorics, a branch of mathematics, the autocorrelation of a word is the set of periods of this word. More precisely, it is a sequence of values which indicate how much the end of a word looks likes the beginning of a word. This value can be used to compute, for example, the average value of the first occurrence of this word in a random string.

Definition
In this article, A is an alphabet, and  a word on A of length n. However, we redefine this notion below.

Autocorrelation vector
That is  indicates whether .

Note that  is always equal to 1, since the prefix and the suffix of length  are both equal to the word . Similarly,  is 1 if and only if the first and the last letters are the same.

Autocorrelation polynomial
It is a polynomial of degree at most . 

Property
We now indicate some properties which can be computed using the autocorrelation polynomial.

First occurrence of a word in a random string
Let us call  the expectation of the first occurrence of ? in ?  . Then  equals . Here  is the length of v.

The first occurrence of  can be at position 1 in only one way in both case.
This explain why, on average, the first  arrive later than the first .
This number is independent of the autocorrelation polynomial. An occurrence of  may overlap another occurrence in different ways. More precisely, each 1 in its autocorrelation vector correspond to a way for occurrence to overlap. Since many occurrences of  can be packed together, using overlapping, but the average number of occurrences does not change, it follows that the distance between two non-overlapping occurrences is greater when the autocorrelation vector contains many 1's.

Ordinary generating functions
Autocorrelation polynomials allows to give simple equations for the ordinary generating functions (OGF) of many natural questions.

References

Formal languages
Combinatorics on words